Play is an album by the American jazz guitarist Mike Stern, released in 1999 through Atlantic Records.

The album peaked at No. 21 on Billboard'''s Traditional Jazz Albums chart.

Production
Bill Frisell and John Scofield contributed to the album. It was tracked live, with few overdubs.

Critical receptionThe Times thought that Stern "displays a new maturity—these are properly integrated songs, not simply backdrops for long solos." The Los Angeles Daily News'' wrote that the album is "highlighted by fine work from Stern and Scofield on the title track's minor blues, the New Orleans-flavored 'Small World' and the bop-driven 'Outta Town'."

Track listing 
 "Play"
 "Small World"
 "Outta Town"
 "Blue Tone"
 "Tipatina's"
 "All Heart"
 "Frizz"
 "Link"
 "Goin' Under"
 "Big Kids"

Personnel 
Mike Stern – guitar (all tracks)
John Scofield – guitar (tracks 1, 2 & 3)
Bill Frisell – guitar (tracks 4, 6, 7 & 10)
Ben Perowsky – drums (tracks 1, 2, 3, 4, 6, 7 & 10)
Dennis Chambers – drums (tracks 5, 8 & 9)
Lincoln Goines – bass (all tracks)
Bob Malach – tenor saxophone (tracks 3, 5, 6, 8 & 9)
Jim Beard – keyboards (tracks 1, 2, 3, 5, 6, 8 & 9)

References

1999 albums
Mike Stern albums
Atlantic Records albums